Deux-Montagnes is a future terminus station of the Réseau express métropolitain (REM) in Deux-Montagnes, Quebec, Canada. REM service at the station is scheduled to begin in the fourth quarter of 2024. The station will serve as the terminus of the Deux-Montagnes branch of the REM.

Until the end of 2020, Deux-Montagnes was a commuter rail station operated by Exo and was the northern terminus of the Deux-Montagnes line.

Origin of name
Deux-Montagnes takes its name from Deux-Montagnes, the municipality where it is located, although this station took the name of the original Gare Deux-Montagnes, now Grand-Moulin station. The building serves as municipal offices, as well as a passenger waiting area for the connecting routes. Outside of the building, is the former CN 6710, a GE boxcab electric-powered locomotive that brought trains through the Mount Royal Tunnel until 1995.

Location
The station is located at 400, boul. Deux-Montagnes, near Autoroute 640 (exit 8). The station is also served by pedestrian walkways and bicycle routes in Deux-Montagnes.

Connecting bus routes

CIT Laurentides

References

External links

 Deux-Montagnes Commuter Train Station Information (RTM) 
 Deux-Montagnes Commuter Train Station Schedule (RTM) 
 CIT Laurentides Website
 Route List
 Route Maps

Former Exo commuter rail stations
Railway stations in Laurentides
Réseau express métropolitain railway stations
Railway stations in Canada opened in 1995